Apius Auchab (born 3 October 1959) is a Namibian politician who has served as the president of the United Democratic Front since 2013. He has been a Member of the National Assembly since 2015. He was previously the party's vice president from 2009 until 2013. Auchab was also the regional councillor for the Dâures Constituency in the Erongo Region until his defeat in 2010.

Life and career
Auchab was born on 3 October 1959 in Omaruru, South West Africa. He worked as a teacher from 1981 until 1990. He was then involved in community activism between 1990 and 1998. Auchab served as the regional councillor for the Dâures Constituency until his defeat in the 2010 local and regional elections. From 2009 until 2013, he served as vice president of the United Democratic Front.

UDF presidency
Long-serving UDF president Justus ǁGaroëb announced his retirement in 2013. Auchab was elected as his successor in December 2013 after he received 214 out of 311 votes. After the 2014 general election, he became a Member of the National Assembly. During his first term, he served on the economy and public administration, constitution and law, and natural resources standing committees.

He was his party's presidential candidate in the 2019 general election. He received more than 22,000 votes and came in fifth. Auchab was sworn in for his second term as an MP on 20 March 2020.

Views
Auchab is opposed to abortion rights. He supports land reform, saying that access to land is a "birthright".

References

External links

Living people
1959 births
Members of the National Assembly (Namibia)
People from Omaruru
People from Erongo Region
United Democratic Front (Namibia) politicians
Namibian educators
21st-century Namibian politicians